Richard Legendre (born January 19, 1953 in Montmagny, Quebec) is a former professional tennis player and politician in Quebec, Canada.

Tennis 
Legendre was born in Montmagny, Quebec.  He once represented Canada at the Davis Cup and had a career-high tennis ranking of World No. 232 in singles (December 1978).  He played NCAA collegiate tennis at Florida State University in 1972 and 1973.

Politics 
He was the Quebec minister of sports in Bernard Landry's cabinet, after being elected as a Member of the National Assembly of Quebec for the riding of Blainville in 2001.  In 2005 he was a candidate in the Parti Québécois's leadership election, a bid notably supported by former Quebec minister François Legault and sprinter and olympic medalist Bruny Surin. Legendre placed third with 7.5% of the vote.

In the 2007 elections, Legendre was surprisingly defeated by the Action democratique du Quebec's Pierre Gingras who was a former mayor for the City of Blainville. The party nearly won every seat in the lower Laurentians region. Legendre was Vice-President of Montreal Impact; he was nominated on August 13, 2007.

He's now teaching at HEC Montreal, and regularly appears on TVA Sports morning show Les Partants commenting on economic sports news.

Electoral record (partial)

See also 
2005 Parti Québécois leadership election
Quebec sovereignty movement

References

External links 
 
 
Bilan du Siècle biography

1953 births
Canadian expatriate sportspeople in the United States
Canadian male tennis players
Canadian sportsperson-politicians
Florida State Seminoles men's tennis players
French Quebecers
Living people
Parti Québécois MNAs
Politicians from Montreal
Tennis players from Montreal
21st-century Canadian politicians